The World Leadership Awards have been prepared by the World Leadership Forum of England, UK (reportedly dissolved as of 2012), and have been presented to city leaders who have shown exceptional imagination, foresight or resilience in a number of key fields - especially cities that have reversed trends, shaken off traditional images, and acted as an example and inspiration to others.

The Awards were instituted in 2005 and awarded in 2006 and 2007. Press releases from some winners have indicated that in 2006, around 400 cities worldwide, were invited to compete in 15 categories of urban quality and improvement.

Note that the Awards (or others of the same name) have since been awarded in 2012, after the apparent 2009 collapse of the sponsoring World Leadership Forum organization.

Winners
(For full list of 2006 winners, see separate heading below.)

 World Leadership Awards
- category: Architecture & Civil Engineering
- category: Culture & the Arts
- category: Housing
- category: Economy &/or Employment
- category: Environment
 2006 - Salt Lake City, Utah, USA

- category: Law & Order

- category: Urban Renewal
 2005 - Phnom Penh, Cambodia
 2006 - St. Louis, Missouri, USA
 - Other Shortlist finalists for 2006:
 * Kansas City, Missouri, USA
 * Manchester, England, UK
 * Calcutta, India

- category: Transport

- category: Utilities / Water / Conservation
 2006 - Albuquerque, New Mexico, USA (mayor: Martin Chávez)

Winners in 2006
The winners of the 2006 World Leadership Awards were announced at the Royal Courts of Justice in London.

 Architecture & Civil Engineering: City of Lima - City of Yellow Stairs
 Economy & Employment: City of Krakow - Tourist Development
 Education & Development of the Young: City of Lagos - Community-Youth Integration
 Environment: City of Calgary - Making a difference
 Health: City of Mississauga - Healthy City Stewardship Centre
 Law & Order: City of Stuttgart - Partnership for Safety and Security
 Science & Technology: City of Lagos - Improving Quality of Lives
 Town Planning: City of Lima - South Ecological Park
 Transport: Mexico City - Sustainable Transport
 Urban Renewal: City of St. Louis - Strategy for Renewal
 Utilities: City of Albuquerque - Securing a Priceless Future

References

External links
 World Leadership Forum
 World Leadership Awards

Governance and civic leadership awards